Juha Reini (born 19 March 1975) is Finnish former professional footballer who played as a defender.

Playing career
A versatile defender, Reini started his professional career in Finland with Veikkausliiga club VPS in 1996. In 1998, he moved to Genk in Belgium. There, he won two Belgian championships – in 1999 and 2002 – and also captained the side. In 2002, Reini moved to Dutch Eredivisie club AZ. He suffered multiple injuries during his stint with the club, which limited his appearances for both club and for the Finland national football team. After having played eight seasons of professional football abroad, Reini returned to his first club KPV in 2006, and retired after the Finnish Cup final against HJK Helsinki. For the Finnish national team, he gained 23 caps.

Managerial career
From 2006 to 2010, Reini worked as a scout for AZ, first in Scandinavia and later focusing only on Finland. He was then appointed sporting director of his former club, VPS in autumn 2008, but left the position after one season, where he temporarily managed the first team alongside Petri Vuorinen. In the autumn of 2009, Reini announced his resignation from the VPS on personal grounds.

From 2010 to 2013, Reini worked as the agent of several Finnish national team players together with Tapio Raatikainen. Their clients included Teemu Pukki, Joona Toivio, Kasper Hämäläinen and Jere Uronen. In the summer of 2013, he took up the position of chairman of TPS, holding office until January 2015. He then moved to the position of TPS's director of sports, from which he resigned in the summer of 2015, citing his desire to continue his career in coaching positions.

Apart from management, Reini has been an expert with Yle Sport since 2002. In addition, Reini has been a member of the Football Association of Finland's Top Football Committee in 2006–2012.

References

External links

1975 births
Living people
People from Kokkola
Finnish footballers
Finnish expatriate footballers
Vaasan Palloseura players
K.R.C. Genk players
AZ Alkmaar players
Kokkolan Palloveikot players
Finland international footballers
Veikkausliiga players
Belgian Pro League players
Eredivisie players
Expatriate footballers in Belgium
Expatriate footballers in the Netherlands
Association football defenders
Finnish expatriate sportspeople in Belgium
Finnish expatriate sportspeople in the Netherlands
AZ Alkmaar non-playing staff
Vaasan Palloseura managers
GBK Kokkola players
Sportspeople from Central Ostrobothnia